Stephen Francis Lynch (born March 31, 1955) is an American businessman, attorney and politician who has served as a member of the U.S. House of Representatives from Massachusetts since 2001. A Democrat, he represents Massachusetts's 8th congressional district, which includes the southern fourth of Boston and many of its southern suburbs. Lynch was previously an ironworker and lawyer, and served in both chambers of the Massachusetts General Court.

Born and raised in South Boston, Lynch is the son of an ironworker. He went into the trade after high school, working in an apprenticeship and later joining his father's union. He became the union's youngest president, at age 30, while attending the Wentworth Institute of Technology. He received his J.D. from Boston College Law School in 1991. For several years, he worked as a lawyer, primarily representing housing project residents and labor unions. In 1994, Lynch was elected to the Massachusetts House of Representatives. During his tenure, his progressive views and advocacy for South Boston helped propel him to the Massachusetts Senate in 1995, when he won a special election to succeed state senator William Bulger.

Lynch won a special election to represent the state's 9th district in the United States House of Representatives in 2001, and has been reelected ever since. His district was redrawn into the 8th district in 2013. He sits on the Financial Services and Oversight and Government Reform Committees. Lynch ran for the Democratic nomination in the 2013 special election for the U.S. Senate, losing to Ed Markey.

Early life, education, and business career
The fourth of six children, Lynch was born on March 31, 1955, in the neighborhood of South Boston. He was raised with his five sisters in the Old Colony Housing Project. His father, Francis Lynch, was an ironworker who dropped out of school in eighth grade. His mother, Anne (née Havlin), was a night-shift post office worker. Both parents came from fourth-generation South Boston families. He attended St. Augustine Elementary School and South Boston High School. During high school vacations he began working in construction alongside his father. After graduating from high school in 1973, Lynch became an apprentice ironworker. For the next six years he worked on high-altitude structural ironwork throughout the country for various companies, including General Motors and U.S. Steel.

In 1977 Lynch was arrested for smoking marijuana at a Willie Nelson concert at the Illinois State Fair, leading to a $50 misdemeanor fine. In 1979 he was arrested for assault and battery of six Iranian students at an anti-American protest in Boston, a charge that was later dropped. Around this time, he developed "a problem with alcohol", leading him to join Alcoholics Anonymous. (He reportedly left AA after meeting his future wife several years later, but continued to attend occasional meetings through the 2000s.)

Having personal experience with worker safety concerns, Lynch developed aspirations beyond his trade. When a 1979 blizzard forced his project in Wisconsin to shut down, he spent the extra time taking courses at the University of Wisconsin–Madison. Shortly thereafter, his father was diagnosed with cancer, and so Lynch returned to Boston. In the early 1980s, he was elected to the executive board of the Iron Workers Local 7 union. At age 30, he was elected president of the board, the youngest in the local's history. During this time he spent his nights and weekends attending the Wentworth Institute of Technology, from which he graduated cum laude with a bachelor's degree in construction management in 1988.

That year Lynch led a three-week labor strike, refusing to sign a contract with the Associated General Contractors  despite pressure from within his union. The union international ultimately signed the contract without Lynch's approval, causing him to file suit against them. He later remarked, "Nothing I ever do will be as volatile as being union president during those times." This debacle forced him to miss the first three weeks of classes at Boston College Law School, where he had enrolled. Nevertheless, he graduated with a J.D. in 1991. After graduating he joined the law office of Gabriel O. Dumont, Jr., representing labor unions and unemployed workers.

Throughout law school and the following years, he often worked pro bono, representing housing project residents at Boston Housing Authority (BHA) hearings. In one high-profile 1994 case, Lynch provided free legal services to 14 teenagers, all white, who were accused of physically attacking a Hispanic teenager and harassing the family of his white girlfriend over a period of six months. Lynch claimed the youths had been "overcharged" and helped some of them avoid criminal charges and eviction by the BHA.

Lynch was a onetime tax delinquent. In the mid-1980s the city of Boston placed liens on four properties he owned due to several thousand dollars of unpaid property taxes. He owed Massachusetts $2,000 in overdue taxes from 1985 to 1998, and for several years owed the IRS $4,000.

Massachusetts House of Representatives

With numerous cases under his belt, Lynch developed a reputation in his community, and friends encouraged him to run for office. In early 1994 he phoned Paul J. Gannon, the Democratic state representative from the 4th Suffolk district, to announce a run against him. While both candidates were labor advocates with similar backgrounds, Lynch called himself "the conservative candidate". He criticized Gannon for not supporting the Veterans Council, which had prevented a gay rights group from marching in the local St. Patrick's Day Parade. Lynch's base of supporters in the projects allowed him to win the Democratic primary by 600 votes, and he continued to victory in the general election.

As a state representative, Lynch was a vocal advocate for his neighborhood. He opposed  a plan by Governor Bill Weld and New England Patriots owner Robert Kraft to construct a $200 million football stadium by the publicly owned South Boston waterfront. He led the opposition to a proposed asphalt plant in South Bay, and sponsored an amendment to a state bond bill that banned its construction.

Massachusetts Senate
When President of the Massachusetts Senate William Bulger announced his resignation from his 1st Suffolk seat in late 1995, Lynch filed nomination papers for the special election to replace him. Bulger's son, attorney William M. Bulger, Jr., also ran for the seat, as did another lawyer, Patrick Loftus. The race grew from the grassroots of South Boston, with neighborhood issues such as development, crime, and education ruling the debate. The candidates declared their mutual respect. Lynch won the March 1996 primary, defeating Bulger Jr. and Loftus 56%–35%–9%. In April, he defeated Republican Richard William Czubinski 96%–4%, and he was inaugurated on May 1, 1996. He was reelected unopposed in 1996, 1998, and 2000.

As a state senator, Lynch continued to lead opposition to the proposed football stadium and vocally opposed a proposal to sell the publicly owned Marine Industrial Park. He opposed a hate-crimes bill that would have made racially charged language a felony, and hearkened back to the 1994 racial violence case as an example, arguing that the bill "attacks merely words" and "prosecutes young people who, in my opinion, haven't developed the responsibility and wisdom to measure their words." On the Senate Transportation Committee, Lynch cosponsored a bill in June 1996 to allow certain Boston residents unlimited access to the Ted Williams Tunnel. In 1997 he was named Senate Chairman of the Joint Committee on Commerce and Labor. In response to a budget crisis in the state's nursing homes, due primarily to Medicaid shortfalls, Lynch filed an unsuccessful bill in April 2001 to increase Medicaid funding by $200 million. While in the Senate, he enrolled at Harvard University's John F. Kennedy School of Government, from which he graduated with a master's degree in 1999. Massachusetts law prohibits any elected official from holding more than one office, so Lynch resigned on October 16, 2001, and was sworn in as a member of Congress on the same day.

U.S. House of Representatives

Elections

2001

Lynch announced his candidacy for the 9th district seat in 2001, when longtime incumbent U.S. Representative Joe Moakley, stricken with leukemia, decided not to seek a 17th term. This was a departure from Lynch's previous plan to run for lieutenant governor of Massachusetts. Moakley died in May 2001, before his term ended, and Lynch announced a run for the special election to succeed him. The early front-runner in the race was lawyer Max Kennedy, son of U.S. Senator Robert F. Kennedy. Political missteps dragged Kennedy down in the polls, and his abrupt departure in June 2001 put Lynch in the lead. The remaining candidates included eight Democrats and two Republicans, all with similar political positions; according to The Boston Globe, the candidates "struggled to find areas of conflict" when debating.

In the September Democratic primary, Lynch's main opponents were State Senators Cheryl Jacques, Brian A. Joyce and Marc R. Pacheco. During the campaign, Lynch faced criticism as his past improprieties were uncovered, including two arrests, defaulting on student loans, and a history of tax delinquency. Gay rights advocates attacked him for "a history of supporting anti-gay legislation." Still, Lynch maintained strong local support going into the primary. As he pulled ahead in polls and fundraising, Jacques and Joyce attacked his 1994 racial violence case and subsequent positions on hate crime as evidence that he was not supportive of civil rights.

On September 11, 2001, Lynch won the Democratic primary with 39% of the vote to Jacques's 29%. The same day, the September 11 attacks took place, which dampened the ensuing general election race between Lynch and the Republican nominee, state Senator Jo Ann Sprague. On October 16, he defeated Sprague, 65%-33%.

Tenure
Lynch was sworn into the 107th Congress on October 23, 2001. The ceremony had been delayed for a weekend, as the 2001 anthrax attacks had led to a shutdown of Congressional office buildings. In a press conference after his swearing-in, Lynch remarked on the unlikelihood of his career path, comparing himself to Jed Clampett of The Beverly Hillbillies. He is a moderate Democrat by Massachusetts standards, but a fairly liberal one by national standards. He generally votes more moderate on social issues and liberal on economic and environmental issues. "Calling me the least liberal member from Massachusetts is like calling me the slowest Kenyan in the Boston Marathon", he said in 2010. "It's all relative." He is strongly pro-labor and has focused on bringing manufacturing jobs to his district. He is a co-founder and co-chair of the Congressional Labor and Working Families Caucus.

Committee assignments
 Committee on Financial Services
Subcommittee on Diversity and Inclusion
Subcommittee on National Security, International Development and Monetary Policy
 Committee on Oversight and Government Reform
Subcommittee on National Security (Chair)
Subcommittee on Government Operations
 Committee on Transportation and Infrastructure
Subcommittee on Aviation
Subcommittee on Highways and Transit
 Subcommittee on Railroads, Pipelines and Hazardous Materials

Caucus memberships
 Congressional Arts Caucus
Afterschool Caucuses
Climate Solutions Caucus
Blue Collar Caucus

Political positions

Economy and finance
Lynch has been a member of the House Financial Services Committee since his first term. According to CQ, Lynch supported President George W. Bush's agenda one-third of the time, which was average for Democratic House members. For instance, he supported the Housing and Economic Recovery Act of 2008, which addressed the subprime mortgage crisis, but opposed the Emergency Economic Stabilization Act of 2008, which created the Troubled Asset Relief Program. He supported President Barack Obama's economic agenda, including the American Recovery and Reinvestment Act of 2009 and the Dodd–Frank Wall Street Reform and Consumer Protection Act of 2010.

Lynch has focused on trade policy as a congressman. In 2002 he voted against fast track bills that gave the president the authority to negotiate trade deals without amendments by Congress. In 2007 he voted in favor of the Peru–United States Trade Promotion Agreement despite some Democratic opposition.

Domestic policy
Lynch has sat on the Oversight and Government Reform Committee, formerly called the Government Reform Committee, throughout his House career. He chaired the Subcommittee on Federal Workforce, Post Office, and the District of Columbia from 2009 to 2010. On this subcommittee he has dealt with federal employee recruitment, salary, and benefits.

Lynch advocates health care reform but split with his party on Obama's health care reform efforts. He voted in November 2009 to pass the Affordable Health Care for America Act (AHCAA), the House's health care reform bill. This bill was scrapped by Congressional leaders in favor of the Senate's bill, the Patient Protection and Affordable Care Act (PPACA). Despite pressure from Obama and Democratic leaders, Lynch said he would oppose the PPACA until "they put reform back in the health reform bill." He described the Senate bill as a "surrender" to insurance companies, putting too little pressure on them to reduce costs. He explained, "There's a difference between compromise and surrender, right? And this is a complete surrender of all the things that people thought were important to health care reform." When the PPACA came to a House vote in March 2010, he was the only U.S. representative from New England to vote against it.

On social issues, Lynch was considered a conservative to moderate Democrat in the 2000s. He was anti-abortion, once condemned by the pro-choice group NARAL. He sided with conservatives in the 2005 Terri Schiavo case, voting for federal court intervention. In more recent years, he has advocated and defended funding for Planned Parenthood. In 2021, Lynch voted for the Women's Health Protection Act, signifying a significant shift in his position on the issue.

Lynch has mostly sided with Democratic leaders on gay rights issues, opposing a Federal Marriage Amendment and supporting granting medical benefits to domestic partners of federal employees. He supports same-sex marriage. Lynch's 2022 reelection campaign touted his support for the Equality Act; he is also a member of the Congressional LGBTQ+ Equality Caucus.

In September 2016, Lynch announced on WBUR that he would vote for the November 2016 ballot question that sought to expand the number of charter schools in the state.

On January 3, 2021, the beginning of the 117th Congress, Lynch became the last remaining incumbent House Democrat to have voted against the Affordable Care Act.

2020 coronavirus response efforts 
During an April 2020 House Oversight Committee Hearing that included testimony from Anthony Fauci, director of the National Institute of Allergy and Infectious Diseases, Lynch grew angry over federal miscommunications about the availability of coronavirus testing, and said that cases of COVID-19 had doubled in his district just the day before. Earlier that month, he co-signed a letter with the Massachusetts congressional delegation asking FEMA to release enough ventilators from the Strategic National Stockpile to Massachusetts hospitals, as the state was bracing for a surge of COVID-19 cases at that time.

Lynch has also been interested in improving the Strategic National Stockpile (SNS). On April 23, 2020, he introduced the Strategic National Stockpile Enhancement and Transparency Act (HR 6607). The bill would create a new initiative, the National Emergency Biodefense Network, that would work to ensure, at a state level and with state partners, that each state had enough supplies for emergencies such as pandemics.

Foreign policy and veterans
In the wake of the September 11 attacks, the Oversight and Government Reform Committee had oversight of airport security and some elements of the War in Afghanistan. Lynch sat on the Veterans' Affairs Committee for his first term. He has several Veterans's Affairs (VA) hospitals in his district, and sponsored legislation to increase nurse staffing and allow private physician prescriptions to be filled at VA hospitals.

A supporter of American intervention in the Middle East, Lynch has made 12 trips to Iraq and ten to Afghanistan and Pakistan. Part of these visits' purpose was to ensure accountability in reconstruction projects. He voted for the Iraq War authorization in 2002, against the Democratic House leadership, and later voted to continue funding the war. He supported Obama's drawdown of troops in Iraq throughout 2010 and 2011 and Obama's renewal of the War in Afghanistan, the only Massachusetts representative to vote for funding for Obama's Afghanistan initiative. Lynch voted for increased foreign aid to Pakistan in 2009, but, along with Oversight Chairman John F. Tierney, pushed for strict oversight of the aid's distribution.

Lynch supports lifting the United States' economic sanctions on Cuba. Moakley, his predecessor, was heavily involved in Latin American affairs, and Lynch has made an effort to continue this work. He joined five other congressmen on a 2002 visit to Cuba, where they met with President Fidel Castro.

John Adams Memorial
Lynch supports the creation of a national memorial to John Adams in Washington, D.C., and in 2017 sponsored legislation to create an Adams Memorial Commission to develop and build such a memorial.

U.S. Senate campaigns 
Upon the death of U.S. Senator Ted Kennedy, Massachusetts state law triggered a special election to be held in January 2010. On September 4, 2009, a representative for Lynch took out nomination papers to run in the special election. After speaking with his family and citing the short time frame in which to conduct a campaign, Lynch decided not to seek the Democratic nomination for the seat.

Lynch announced his candidacy for the U.S. Senate on January 31, 2013, seeking to fill the seat then held by John Kerry, who had resigned to become U.S. Secretary of State. Lynch's candidacy in the 2013 special election had been portrayed as an uphill battle against Representative Ed Markey, who had a larger war chest and several major party endorsements. A Politico profile compared Lynch's "common-man touch" and moderate views to that of Republican Scott Brown, who won the 2010 special Senate election by connecting with independent voters. Lynch lost to Markey in the April 30 Democratic primary.

Personal life
Lynch dated Margaret Shaughnessy for 10 years before the two married in 1992. An aide to state Senator Marian Walsh, Shaughnessy was from another South Boston family, one of seven children, and majored in graphic design at the Massachusetts College of Art and Design. She went to high school with Lynch's sisters, and she and Lynch were members of the South Boston Residents Group. , the Lynches live in South Boston with their daughter and a niece. For most of his career, Lynch has been listed in the member's roll as "D-South Boston".

References

External links

Congressman Stephen Lynch official U.S. House website
Stephen Lynch for Congress campaign website

 

|-

|-

1955 births
Living people
21st-century American politicians
American builders
American Roman Catholics
Boston College Law School alumni
Catholics from Massachusetts
Democratic Party members of the United States House of Representatives from Massachusetts
Ironworkers
Harvard Kennedy School alumni
Massachusetts lawyers
Democratic Party Massachusetts state senators
Democratic Party members of the Massachusetts House of Representatives
People from South Boston
Politicians from Boston
American trade union leaders
University of Wisconsin–Madison alumni
Wentworth Institute of Technology alumni
South Boston High School alumni